Circumflex artery may refer to:

 Anterior humeral circumflex artery
 Circumflex branch of left coronary artery
 Circumflex fibular artery
 Circumflex scapular artery
 Deep circumflex iliac artery
 Lateral circumflex femoral artery
 Medial circumflex femoral artery
 Posterior humeral circumflex artery
 Superficial circumflex iliac artery